John Rainforth (born 10 December 1934) is a British bobsledder. He competed in the two-man and the four-man events at the 1956 Winter Olympics.

References

1934 births
Living people
British male bobsledders
Olympic bobsledders of Great Britain
Bobsledders at the 1956 Winter Olympics
Place of birth missing (living people)